Alpha Force is a series of novels written by Chris Ryan, formerly of the Special Air Service. The books are adventure novels aimed at teenagers. The eponymous Alpha Force are a group of five teenagers with unique talents, skills and personalities who were shipwrecked together in the first book, Survival, and after being forced to work together as a team, created strong friendships with each other. Every school holiday they meet up to complete different challenges to test all of their skills but always manage to get sucked into fighting wrongdoing because of their talents and inability to let injustice go unpunished.

Characters 
Alpha Force, the series' protagonists. The name originating from the initial letters of the members' first names, it consists of the five main characters in the series, all in their teenage years. Hex had come up with the name in the first book, Survival, both in reference to the connection with the members' names, as well as the fact that "Alpha" is the first letter in the Ancient Greek alphabet, and indicates a new beginning.

Alex is a survival expert from Northumberland. He is described as being tall with long, gangly limbs. He has floppy blonde hair and grey eyes. His eyes are described as grey until the middle of the series, then they are described as blue. He was taught about surviving in different situations by his father who is a member of the SAS. Despite being rejected from the Army in Red Centre, he still has hopes of following in his father's footsteps. He rarely becomes agitated with people and he always tries to find a logical solution to a situation. He always carries the survival tin that his father gave him and is very attached to it. He is nominated mostly as a team leader by the other four characters, due to his survival skills and experience in the treacherous conditions which he routinely faces. Alex never mentions his family apart from his father, who he helped in Rat Catcher, and his mother; because of this, it is assumed that Alex is an only child.
Li is Anglo-Chinese, and a martial arts expert. Li is described as petite with long, silky black hair that she often ties in a braid. With her parents being zoologists, she knows a lot about nature and animals in particular. She constantly wants to prove herself and is caring but always take the opportunity to do something exciting and a little bit dangerous for the adrenaline rush. She has a fiery temper and is quick to want to fight injustice. She has strong will-power and is not one to give up easily. Li is also a very skilled free climber, although she briefly goes through a phase of Acrophobia in Hunted, after witnessing her former instructor cripple herself in a climbing accident. Li never mentions a sibling, so she is, apparently, an only child. She has a very close relationship with Paulo, which is suggested to be romantic in nature.
Paulo (Paolo) is a laid back Argentinian with curly hair and tan skin. He is the group's medical expert, has great mechanical skills, can drive many forms of vehicle, can pilot a helicopter and small plane to a certain degree, and has an affinity with animals, particularly horses. These skills come from him living on a large ranch in Argentina, since the size of the place can sometimes leave him days away from medical help, and requires him to utilize vehicles to get around the place quickly. Although he seems to be quite lazy, a new mission, an engine to fix or Li can always get him motivated. He is a big flirt and quite vain, but he is a well-loved character.  Paulo is very affectionate towards Li and throughout the series there is an obvious relationship building between the two of them. Paulo mentions a few times throughout the series that he comes from a big family which seems to mainly consist of sisters, all being younger than he is.
Hex is a skilled hacker from "a rough part of London". He is described as having spiky brown hair and green eyes. He is brilliant at code breaking, bypassing most security systems and cracking into computer systems. This also gives him the ability to work things out when others can't, which once caused him to recognise that a supposed accident was actually an assassination. Even though he seems a "couch potato", Hex keeps himself very fit by going to the gym and jogging. Although he is often referred to by the name "Hex," this is actually his codename, and his real name is shown to be "Melvin," something that obviously embarrasses him. He seems to be attracted to Amber, although his first love will always be his palm top. In the books there are mentions of Hex being a loner and an outcast at school. He also mentions that he has a younger brother who, as he says in Survival, nearly got thrown out of school as he was being picked on by a teacher. 
Amber is a rich girl, mentioned to be a billionaire from the United States - She has close cropped hair and dark skin as well as being described as very beautiful. She's a navigational expert, having spent years on her parents' yacht, and is a skilled linguist. She is a diabetic and after her parents were killed on a secret mission she had little will to live; but Alpha Force gave her new motivation. She used to seem rather snobbish, selfish and act very spoiled but as the books progress these qualities lessen, although she can still use that snobbish attitude on a mission. Her supposedly selfish and spoiled nature was later revealed to be because of her urgency over her diabetes. After saving his life at the end of Survival, she develops a genuine affection towards Hex, despite their previous enmity in A-watch. Amber's Uncle John Middleton is a recurring character; providing a base, new challenges and resources for the team. Amber is the only character whose family background is explicitly stated: she is an only child, whose only mentioned relative is her guardian, her Uncle John. Amber lives with her uncle and his housekeeper, Roseanne. Amber also cannot cook, as mentioned in Untouchable, although Hex is surprisingly good at it.

Personal Relationships within the group

Amber and Hex 

Amber seems to take an interest in Hex, as evidenced in Hostage, first when Chris Ryan tells us Alpha Force, and Hex in particular, are the people she loved most. Despite their initial enmity in Survival (due to her parents' role in computer software, which conflicts with his hacker skill, as well their opposing backgrounds), she risks her own life to save his by swimming in shark-infested water to retrieve the antibiotics necessary to treat a Komodo dragon bite. In Blood Money, Li asks Hex and Amber if they have feelings for each other. Hex, embarrassed, refuses to answer unless Li balances in a handstand on a bed frame for a minute; halfway through, she is interrupted by an important discovery by Hex and loses her balance, so he never answers her question. And at the end of the book, Radha asks if Amber and Hex are married when he has seen them flirting with one another (page 312). In Fault Line, Hex writes something to Amber on his Palmtop, near death, but he deletes it before Amber can see. In Untouchable, when Hex is trying to find music on his palmtop to calm Alex down, we see that one of the albums there is named Amber, which seems to be another small indication he is interested in Amber. In Hostage, Amber kisses Hex on the cheek just before she gets taken hostage in the underwater mines. And in Desert Pursuit, Khalid can see straight through Amber, forcing her into admitting that she likes Hex. She can't let anybody know that she is affectionate towards 'Code-boy', so quickly refutes Khalid's statements, however both Khalid and Amber know that she does have a soft spot for Hex.

Li and Paulo 

In Survival, both Li and Paulo take an interest in each other, flirting on occasion. Li is very desperate to find Paulo in Rat-Catcher and Paulo gets very angry and starts to beat Alex up when Li disguises herself as a boy to follow the notorious slaver known as the Scorpion in Desert Pursuit. More evidence of their relationship appears in Blood Money when Li tried to get Hex to admit his fancy towards Amber, by saying "you probably wish Amber was here instead of me," but Hex retorted with "you probably wish Paulo was here instead of me." Also, when they volunteer to build a school for an Indian village during Blood Money, they flirt with one another, flicking mortar playfully at each other, Radha comes up to them and asks if they are married. They were both very surprised at the question and they quickly denied it. In Desert Pursuit, Chris Ryan tells us that Paulo was more fond of Li than he cared to admit and he has been known to give her a fond smile

Alex

Alex doesn't seem to have any girlfriend in any of the books, considering there are only two girls in the entire group, both of which are more interested in the other two boys. In Survival, he kisses Amber after she gets medicine to save Hex, but this is the only indication that he has any feelings for anyone in the group.

Books 

 Survival (2002)
The first book in the series. A-Watch: an unlikely group of kids, are forced to work together to survive when they are marooned on an Indonesian Island. They unite their individual skills in order to keep healthy and survive. They face many dangers such as Komodo dragons, sharks, finding food and water and modern day pirates. Hex is scratched by a Komodo's teeth and becomes extremely ill and feverish. They find antibiotics on a pleasure boat captured by pirates. They and the pleasure boat family escape and are rescued by a helicopter. Their adventures have only just begun on their huge journey with alpha force.
Contains tips for surviving in tropical conditions.

 Rat Catcher (2002)
Alpha Force go to South America to secretly take part in a covert SAS operation to catch an evil drugs baron. After seeing the huge number of children on the street they come up with a plan to try to get information about the drugs baron from them. Paulo goes undercover dressed as a street kid and becomes good friends with a young girl called Eliza. When some "adoption men" come to take Eliza to a "new home", Paulo, against strict instructions goes with Eliza to protect her. Paulo and Eliza soon find themselves in a difficult position when Paulo's cover is blown and the remaining members of Alpha Force go on a mission to rescue Paulo and Eliza from an inevitable peril.
Contains tips on surviving in mountain conditions.

 Desert Pursuit (2003)
Undercover in the Sahara desert, the characters gather evidence of young landmine victims. But they end up racing across the desert when their friend is taken. Then they discover something worse - a gang of child slavers operating in the area.
Contains tips on surviving in a desert.

 Hostage (2003)
Flying to Northern Canada to investigate reports of illegal dumping of toxic waste, they must dive into an icy river, cross the harsh landscape on snowmobiles and use their caving skills to complete their mission. But most of all, they need courage and determination when they come face-to-face with a man who is ready to kill to stop them.
Contains tips on surviving in cave systems.

 Red Centre (2004)
Alpha Force are in Australia, helping with a TV reality show. But when Paulo spots a dangerous terrorist hiding out in a nearby town, events lead them into adventure as the terrorist seizes hostages and flies off into the bush. Supporting the Australian SAS, Alpha Force have to take action - even if it means flying into the full force of an out-of-control bushfire.
Contains tips on escape and evasion.

 Hunted (2004)
Alpha Force head to Zambia to compete in an extreme sports contest. When they discover a horrifying threat to the local wildlife, they take action, only to find themselves facing a flight across the African plains, pursued by a group who are prepared to shoot to kill.
Contains tips on dealing with wild animals.

 Blood Money (2005)
When Amber, Li, Paulo, Hex and Alex visit India to help build a school, they discover an abuse of human rights - the deliberate theft of human organs for transplant surgery. When a young girl is taken, Alpha Force must utilize all their skills to locate her before she is used.
Contains tips on street surveillance.

 Fault Line (2005)
Alpha Force are in Belize for jungle survival training, but when they are caught in an earthquake tremor and must help a victim to safety, they find themselves at the epicentre of a massive quake. As buildings crumble, trapping people underground, and surface structures buckle, Alpha Force need all their courage and skills to help as many as possible survive.
Contains tips on dealing with an earthquake.

 Black Gold (2005)
Alpha Force are in the Caribbean, diving, when a sudden oil spill draws them into a new mission. Having to watch out for assassins, sharks and the bends. All their skills - powerboating, scuba-diving and jetskiing - are needed when an underwater bomb explodes. An assassin's strike thickens the plot and worsens the situation.
Contains tips on survival in and around water.

 Untouchable (2005)
In the Scottish highlands, Alpha Force are helping out on a survival outdoors adventure holiday programme for problem youngsters when they stumble across evidence of an illegal drugs laboratory, hidden deep in the moors of the Laird's land; Alpha Force take it upon themselves to sort out the drug issue themselves. Potholing, kayaking and racing powerful quad bikes across the moors, the team's expertise and individual skills are pushed to their limit.
Contains tips on standard operating procedure, used by alpha force.

References 
 Alpha Force, Chris Ryan

Novel series